Louis Cellot (Cellotius) (1588-20 October 1658) was a French Jesuit, known as a theological writer.

Life
He was born in Paris, and entered the Society of Jesus in 1605. He was occupied in studied of Latin, Greek and Hebrew, and initially taught these subjects. He spent time at Rouen, and then La Flèche, before becoming provincial of his order in France. He died in Paris.

He was a dramatist and poet, as well as a theological writer.

References
 https://archive.org/stream/zfslzeitschrift26unkngoog#page/n87/mode/2up

External links
CERL page

1588 births
1658 deaths
17th-century French Jesuits
17th-century French Catholic theologians
17th-century French poets
17th-century French male writers